Vasile Spătărelu (21 April 1938, in Tâmna, județul Mehedinți – 24 March 2005, in Galați) was a Romanian composer.

References

1938 births
2005 deaths
20th-century classical composers
Romanian classical composers
Male classical composers
20th-century male musicians